Codex Vaticanus, designated by S or 028 (in the Gregory-Aland numbering), ε 1027 (von Soden), formerly called Codex Guelpherbytanus, is a Greek manuscript of the four Gospels which can be dated to a specific year instead of an estimated range. The colophon of the codex lists the date as 949 (on folio 234 verso). This manuscript is one of the four oldest New Testament manuscripts dated in this manner, and the only dated uncial.

The manuscript has complex contents.

Description 

The codex contains 235 parchment leaves, with complete text of the four Gospels. The text is written in two columns per page, 27 lines per page, 15-17 letters per line. It is written in large, oblong, and compressed uncial letters. It has no breathings and accents.

The nomina sacra are written in an abbreviated way.

There is also a division according to the smaller Ammonian sections, with references to the Eusebian Canons.

It contains many later corrections (e.g. ), and margin notes (e.g. .17) predominantly added by later hand. It also includes neumes, and it is one of the oldest manuscript with neumes. The writing is large oblong and compressed, and appears Slavic.

Text 

The Greek text of this codex is a representative of the Byzantine text-type in close relationship to the codices Codex Mosquensis II, Codex Washingtonianus. Kurt Aland placed it in Category V (2061 1051/2 42 12S). It belongs to the textual family K1.

In  it has marginal comment: "In many ancient copies which I have met with I found Barabbas himself likewise called Jesus; that is, the question of Pilate stood there as follows, Τινα θελετε απο των δυο απολυσω υμιν, Ιησουν τον Βαραββαν η Ιησουν τον λεγομενον Χριστον; for apparently the paternal name of the robber was Barabbas, which is interpreted Son of the teacher".

The disputed texts of .44, and Pericope Adultera (-) are marked by asterisks (※) as questionable texts.

In  it reads επορευετο instead of επορευθη.

History 

The name of the scribe was Michael, a monk, who finished his work "in the month of March, the fifth day, the sixth hour, the year 6457, the seventh indiction".

The manuscript was examined and described by Bianchini. It was collated with some errors by Birch in 1781–1783, but collators in his day rarely noticed orthographical forms. Tischendorf in 1866 corrected the collation of Birch. Tischendorf states that facsimile of Bianchini was coarsely executed, he made another for himself.

The codex currently is located in Rome (Bibl. Vat. Gr. 354).

See also 

 List of New Testament uncials
 List of New Testament papyri
 Textual criticism

References

Further reading 

 Andreas Birch, Variae Lectiones ad Textum IV Evangeliorum, Haunie 1801, p. IV-V
 Giovanni Mercati, "Un frammento delle Ipotiposi di Clemente Alessandrino" (Studi e testi, 12; Rome, 1904)
 Bruce M. Metzger, Manuscripts of the Greek Bible: An Introduction to Greek Paleography, Oxford University Press, New York - Oxford, 1991, p. 110
 Edward Maunde Thompson, An introduction to Greek and Latin palaeography, Clarendon Press: Oxford 1912, p. 215.

External links 

 Codex Vaticanus 354, S (028) at the Encyclopedia of Textual Criticism

Greek New Testament uncials
10th-century biblical manuscripts
Manuscripts of the Vatican Library